Something Special is a compilation album by Jim Reeves, released in 1971 on RCA Victor.

Track listing

Charts

References 

1971 compilation albums
Jim Reeves albums
RCA Victor compilation albums